Baker's Dozen is a patience or card solitaire using a single pack of fifty-two playing cards. The game is so called because of the 13 columns in the game, the number in a baker's dozen.

History 
First published by Dick in 1883 as The Baker's Dozen, the rules have changed little since. The only exception is that, in Dick's description, the thirteen packets are dealt face down and only the top card is turned. Only when the exposed top cards are moved to the foundations or other depots, may the next card be turned over. However, in later versions, thirteen columns are dealt face up and overlapping so that all the cards are visible, making the game easier.

Rules
First, the cards are dealt into thirteen packets of four cards each to form the tableau, resulting in 13 columns. Any king that is in the top or middle of each column must be placed on the bottom before the game starts. Two kings that are mixed into one column are placed on the bottom without changing their order.

The objective of the game is to build all the cards onto the four foundations by moving cards around to release others. The player must first free up the four aces and if one of them is found, it is placed on the foundation. Building on the foundation is up by suit, each from ace to king.

Only the top cards of each column are available. Cards on the tableau, if they cannot be placed on the foundations yet, can be built down regardless of suit. Furthermore, once all cards are taken out of a column, the column can never be filled.

The game is won when all cards end up in the foundations.

Related games 
Games that are related to Baker's Dozen include:

 In Spanish Patience, any card can fill empty tableau spaces. (In some sources, the foundations are built up regardless of suit)
 Castles in Spain is akin to Spanish Patience, but the cards in the tableau are built down by alternate color.  In some variations, the tableau is dealt face-down aside from the top cards of each column.
 In Good Measure, two aces are taken out and placed on the foundations while the rest of the deck is shuffled and laid out in columns of five cards, resulting in 10 columns. Like in Baker's Dozen, Kings that are at the top or in the middle of their respective columns are placed at the bottom and the game proceeds in the process stated above.
 Portuguese Solitaire is halfway between Baker's Dozen and Spanish Patience because empty columns can only be filled with Kings.
 Bisley builds foundations upwards from Ace and downwards from King simultaneously.

See also
 Bisley
 List of patiences and solitaires
 Glossary of patience and solitaire terms

References

Literature 
 Dick, William Brisbane (1883). Dick's Games of Patience, Or, Solitaire with Cards. 44 games. NY: Dick & Fitzgerald.

Open packers
Single-deck patience card games
American card games
French deck card games